Susan Valentine (born 27 January 1951 in London), known until 2015 as Susan Skipper, is a British television, film and stage actress. She is best known for playing the parts of Victoria Bourne in The Cedar Tree, Tina in West End Tales and Madeleine in Don't Wait Up, all on British television. She is the widow of Anthony Valentine, to whom she was married for 33 years.

After attending the Central School of Speech and Drama in London she made her television debut in a 1974 two part episode of the Thames TV drama anthology Rooms entitled "Jo and Anne" before appearing in the Carry On Laughing sitcom series in 1975. She went on to appear in series like The Cedar Tree, West End Tales, Don't Wait Up (beside Nigel Havers), The Sweeney and Doctor Who. In 1982 she was seen as Elizabeth Sarah Lavinia Spencer, Lady Diana's oldest sister, in the television drama Charles & Diana: A Royal Love Story by James Goldstone. In 1987 she had a short appearance in a flashback sequence as Emily Lloyd's mother in David Leland's film Wish You Were Here (1987). She had also an engagement as stage actress at the Mill Theatre Sonning where she played e.g. the role of Pat Cooper in the Terence Rattigan play Separate Tables.

She was the first female voice of Sat-nav.

Skipper married the British actor Anthony Valentine in 1982. He died on 2 December 2015.

References

External links
 Short biography and filmography at Associated International Management
 

1951 births
Alumni of the Royal Central School of Speech and Drama
English television actresses
Living people
English stage actresses
English film actresses